Marjory, Countess of Buchan, also known as Margaret de Buchan, was a Scottish noblewoman.

She inherited the earldom from her father, Fergus, Earl of Buchan, who died without male issue. Marjory was married to William Comyn, Lord of Badenoch, the son of Richard Comyn and his wife Hextilda of Tynedale. The marriage was William's second marriage, with William becoming jure uxoris Earl of Buchan.

During 1219, Marjory and William founded the Cistercian Abbey in Deer, dedicated to Mary. William died in 1233, Marjory being Countess in her own right until she was succeeded by her son Alexander, at her death.

Family
Marjory and William are known to have had at least seven children.
Idonea Comyn, married Gilbert de la Hay of Erroll.
Alexander Comyn, married Elizabeth de Quincy
William Comyn
Margory Comyn, married John de Keith.
Fergus Comyn, Lord of Gorgyn
Elizabeth Comyn, married Uilleam, Earl of Mar.
Agnes Comyn, married Philip de Meldrum.

References
Young, Alan, Robert the Bruce's Rivals: The Comyns, 1213-1314, (East Linton, 1997)

12th-century births
13th-century mormaers
13th-century Scottish women
Earls or mormaers of Buchan